Ithiel Blake Nason (1839 – May 27, 1893) was an American-born businessman and political figure in British Columbia. He represented Cariboo in the Legislative Assembly of British Columbia from 1888 to 1890.

He was born in Maine and came to Antler Creek in 1861, constructing a number of sawmills in the area. Nason married Mary Watson in 1877. He lived in Richfield. He was elected to the assembly in an 1888 by-election held after Robert McLeese resigned his seat to run for a seat in the Canadian House of Commons. Nason died in Victoria at the age of 53.

References

External links 
 

1839 births
1893 deaths
American emigrants to pre-Confederation British Columbia
Independent MLAs in British Columbia